Ruben Garcia (born April 1, 1946) is an American NASCAR racer from South El Monte, California. He started out in the Winston West Series.  He is best remembered for hitting the wall at the Riverside International Raceway on June 12, 1988, when he came off turn 9 and hit the wall near the grandstands. He wasn't injured, but did not race in the Winston West again.

References
 

1946 births
Living people
NASCAR drivers
Sportspeople from Los Angeles County, California
People from Greater Los Angeles
Racing drivers from California
Racing drivers from Los Angeles